The Greek Orthodox Metropolis of New Jersey is one of the Metropolises of the Greek Orthodox Archdiocese of America with 54 parishes.

References

Dioceses of the Ecumenical Patriarchate of Constantinople
Eastern Orthodox dioceses in the United States